The Larsen Family House, at 84 State St. in Willits, California, was built in 1904.  It was listed on the National Register of Historic Places in 1995.

It is Queen Anne in style.

In 1994, it was occupied by Kimberly's Jewelry.

References

National Register of Historic Places in Mendocino County, California
Queen Anne architecture in California
Houses completed in 1904